was the pen-name of , a Japanese haiku poet active during the Taishō and Shōwa periods of Japan.

Early life
Ogiwara Tōkichi was born in Shinmei, Shiba, Tokyo City (present-day Hamamatsu, Minato, Tokyo), the second son of a merchant who owned a general goods store called Nitta-ya. The Ogiwara family was originally from Takada, Echigo Province (present-day Jōetsu, Niigata), and his grandfather Tōkichi had moved to Edo as a young man. Both of his siblings died in infancy. Although he attended Seisoku Junior High School, Ogiwara was expelled after publishing a student newspaper criticizing the school's educational methods and administration. After entering Azabu Junior High School, he quit drinking and smoking, seriously engaged in studying, and gained admission to Tokyo Imperial University. While a student majoring in linguistics, he became interested in writing haiku.

Literary career
Seisensui co-founded the avant-garde literary magazine Sōun ("Layered Clouds") in 1911, together with fellow haiku poet Kawahigashi Hekigoto. Ogiwawa was a strong proponent of abandoning haiku traditions, especially the "season words" so favored by Takahama Kyoshi, and even the 5-7-5 syllable norms. In his Haiku teisho (1917), he broke with Hekigoto and shocked the haiku world by advocating further that haiku be transformed into free verse. His students included Ozaki Hōsai and Taneda Santōka. His role in promoting the format of free-style haiku has been compared with that of Masaoka Shiki for traditional verse, with the contrast that Seisensui was blessed with both vigorous health, and considerable wealth. He also was able to use new media to promote his style, including lectures and literary criticism on national radio.

Seisensui left more than 200 works, including collections of haiku, essays, and travelogues. His principal anthologies are Wakiizuru mono (1920) and Choryu (1964). He also wrote a number of commentaries on the works of Matsuo Bashō.

In 1965, he became a member of the Japan Art Academy.

Private life
Seisensui's wife and daughter perished in the Great Kantō earthquake of 1923, and his mother died the same year. He moved to Kyoto briefly, and lived for a while at a chapel within the Buddhist temple of Tofuku-ji. He also began a period of travel around the country. He remarried in 1929, and relocated to Kamakura, Kanagawa. He moved to Azabu in Tokyo until his house was destroyed during World War II. He then moved back to Kamakura in 1944, where he lived until his death.

See also
Japanese literature
List of Japanese authors

References

Ueda, Makoto. Modern Japanese Poets and the Nature of Literature. Stanford University Press (1983). 

1884 births
1976 deaths
Japanese literary critics
People from Tokyo
University of Tokyo alumni
20th-century Japanese poets
Japanese haiku poets